For lists of England national football team results see:

 England national football team results (1872–1899)
 England national football team results (1900–1929)
 England national football team results (1930–1959)
 England national football team results (1960–1979)
 England national football team results (1980–1999)
 England national football team results (2000–2019)
 England national football team results (2020–present)
 England national football team results (unofficial matches)